Artur Żmijewski may refer to:

 Artur Żmijewski (actor) (born 1966), Polish actor
 Artur Żmijewski (filmmaker) (born 1966), Polish movie maker, visual artist, photographer